Slätta SK is a Swedish football club located in Falun.

Background
Slätta SK currently plays in Division 4 Dalarna which is the sixth tier of Swedish football. They play their home matches at the Dalavallen in Falun.

The club is affiliated to Dalarnas Fotbollförbund.

Season to season

Attendances
In recent seasons Slätta SK have had the following average attendances:

Footnotes

External links
 Slätta SK – Official website
 Slätta SK on Facebook

Football clubs in Dalarna County
1976 establishments in Sweden